The Ludington Public Library is one of the two branches of the Mason County District Library administrative system. This library, as the main branch, is located in downtown Ludington, in Mason County in the Lower Peninsula of Michigan. The library started in 1872.

The Pere Marquette Literary Club helped in the formation of a permanent city library. They took financial support from Andrew Carnegie to construct the library building, which opened in 1906. The building has since had major expansions and is still operational.

The library has metal allegorical sculptures at various parts of its surrounding property.

History

The Ludington Public Library had its beginnings 1872. In 1881, the building and all library contents were destroyed in a major city fire. The Pere Marquette Literary Club worked to obtain a grant from the Carnegie Institution for construction of the new Ludington library. 

In 1906, the Ludington Carnegie library building was declared as the library that will "stand a thousand years."

On March 1, 1906, with 3,800 books in its collection, the library made its debut.

In 2011, after firing a staff member for releasing a "tell all" about the library and its "unsavory regulars", the library was sued in a federal court for free speech violations.

Sculptures 
The "Flights of Learning" sculpture is at the front of the Ludington Public Library.

The "Double the Fun" sculpture was installed in 2014. Modeled by sculptor W. Stanley Proctor, it pays tribute to a high school English teacher Sallie Peterson Ferguson. It shows her sitting on a bench reading to a young boy and girl, representing her passion for reading.

Gallery

References

Further reading 

 
 
 
 
James L. Cabot (Columnist), three-part series on the Ludington Public Library:

 

 
 
 
 
 Book 12, Common Council of the City of Ludington, September 7, 1904
 Ludington Record-Appeal, 2-9-1905, Volume XXXVIII, No. 26

External links
 Mason County District Library
 Ludington Public Library

Library buildings completed in 1906
1906 establishments in Michigan
Public libraries in Michigan
Edward Lippincott Tilton buildings
Buildings and structures in Mason County, Michigan
Education in Mason County, Michigan